North County Christian School is a private Christian school in Florissant, Missouri, USA. Established in 1962 with a kindergarten class of 12 students, NCCS has grown to a school of 540 preschool, elementary, middle and high school students. NCCS currently has over 400 families enrolled representing over 130 churches and 5 school districts.

With the acquisition of the New Campus, located at 845 Dunn Road in Florissant, in July 2004 the school has moved its entire operations for preschool to grade 12 to the New Campus.  The  campus features a preschool / elementary education building with 28 classrooms. A secondary education building with 21 classrooms including three science labs, a video production room, a drama classroom complete with performance stage.  The elementary and secondary buildings are linked by a common fine arts and library building that features a spacious library, a computer instruction lab, an art room, band room, choir room and private practice rooms. The campus also includes a full size gymnasium, a large cafeteria, a prayer chapel, and an administrative building.  Outdoors, NCCS has two playgrounds, a softball field a lighted athletic field complete with stadium seating for 500.

North County Christian School is registered with the Missouri Department of Elementary and Secondary Education in Jefferson City.  The school is a member of the Association of Christian Schools International, the Nazarene International Educators Association and the National Institute for Learning Disabilities.

On February 23, 2010, North County Christian School is accredited through the Association of Christian Schools International (ACSI) for the secondary grades 7-12. North County Christian School will now begin the process for completing the necessary requirements for accreditation of its K-6 educational program.

NCCS's association with these organizations offers opportunities for student activities and teacher development.

Admission policy
North County Christian School admits students of any race, color, national or ethnic origin to all the rights, privileges, programs, and activities generally accorded or made available to the students at the school.  It does not discriminate on the basis of race, color, national or ethnic origin, in administration of its educational policies, admission policies, financial aid programs, athletic or other school-administered programs.

Admittance is contingent upon a satisfactory record (both behaviorally and academically), satisfactory results on our entrance examination, and parental assurance that they and the student share the same goals and objectives of the school.

Academics

Accreditation
North County Christian School is member of Association of Christian Schools International and completed the three-year accreditation process in the spring of 2010. North County Christian School is recognized by the Missouri Department of Elementary and Secondary Education. Graduates from North County Christian School have been accepted at all State of Missouri Universities and Colleges and at numerous colleges and universities across the United States.

Faculty
The faculty is 38 full-time teachers with 30 Bachelor's degree and 7 Master's Degrees.
Teaching experience by years:
0-5 36%
6-15 40%
16+ 24%

Athletics
North County Christian School is a member of the Twin Rivers Christian Activities Association and the Missouri Christian School Athletic Association.

Girls' sports

Fall sports
Varsity Volleyball
Jr. Varsity Volleyball

Winter sports
Varsity Basketball
Varsity Cheerleading
Jr. High Basketball
Jr. High Cheerleading

Spring sports
Girls Soccer
Track

Boys' sports

Fall sports
Varsity Soccer

Winter sports
Varsity Basketball
Jr. Varsity Basketball
Jr. High Basketball

Spring sports
Varsity Baseball
Varsity Track

External links
North County Christian School's Website

References

Christian schools in Missouri
High schools in St. Louis County, Missouri
Private schools in St. Louis County, Missouri
Educational institutions established in 1962
Private high schools in Missouri
Private middle schools in Missouri
Private elementary schools in Missouri
1962 establishments in Missouri
Buildings and structures in St. Louis County, Missouri